Operation Zet was a secret operation in 1937–1941 by the Soviet Union to provide military and technical resources to the Republic of China as a part of the Sino-Soviet Non-Aggression Pact.

The operation aimed to help China resist the invasion of the Imperial Japanese Army during World War II. It was part of the Soviet anti-imperialist effort worldwide. In addition, the Soviet Union and the Empire of Japan had a longstanding rivalry that sometimes resulted in open hostilities.

Under Operation Zet, the Soviets provided China with warplanes, bombers, tanks, antiaircraft weapons, ammunition, and transport vehicles. The operation began with the deployment of 225 combat aircraft, along with Soviet volunteers. 

The operation was carried out in secret to maintain plausible deniability and to resist the expansionist efforts of Japan to establish itself as the pre-eminent political force in East Asia. Under the name of Soviet Air Force Volunteers, Soviet troops fought in the defense of Nanjing, Wuhan, Nanchang, and Chongqing. Over 250 Soviet volunteer pilots and 885 aircraft were provided to China. The aircraft included Polikarpov I-15, Polikarpov I-16, and Polikarpov I-153.

See also
 Sino-Soviet Non-Aggression Pact
 Lend-Lease

References

External links
Soviet military aid to China, 1937--1939

China–Soviet Union relations
Zet